Wittig is a surname, and may refer to:

 Burghardt Wittig (born 1947), German biochemist
 Curt Wittig, American chemist
 David Wittig (born 1955), American executive
 Edward Wittig (1879–1941), Polish sculptor
 Ferdinand Wittig (1851-1909), American politician
 Georg Wittig (1897–1987), German chemist
 Iris Wittig (1928-1978), German military pilot
 Johnnie Wittig (1914–1999), former Major League pitcher
 Martin C. Wittig (born 1964), German CEO
 Michael Wittig (born 1976), American musician
 Monique Wittig (1935–2003), French author and feminist theorist
 Peter Wittig (born 1954), German diplomat 
 Rüdiger Wittig (born 1946), German professor of geobotany and ecology
 Sigmar Wittig (born 1940), German Chair of the European Space Agency
 Susan Wittig Albert (born 1940), American mystery writer

See also
 Wittich
 Wittig River
 1,2-Wittig rearrangement
 2,3-Wittig rearrangement
 Wittig reaction